Kanti Bhusan Gangopadhyay (known as Kanti Ganguly) is an Indian politician, belonging to the Communist Party of India (Marxist). He served as a minister in the Left Front government of West Bengal.

He was initially minister in charge of Sunderbans Development and after the death of Subhas Chakraborty in 2009, he was also allotted the portfolio of sports and youth welfare.

The son of the late Bhuban Mohan Gangopadhyay, he is a commerce graduate.

He was elected to state assembly in 2001 and 2006 from Mathurapur.
Kanti Ganguly is one of the few indian politicians who prefer working on ground and helping people of his area instead of giving speeches to win elections. He was accused in the Bijon Setu massacre.

References

Communist Party of India (Marxist) politicians from West Bengal
Living people
West Bengal MLAs 2001–2006
West Bengal MLAs 2006–2011
People from South 24 Parganas district
1943 births